The Conference Party, or Congress Party, is a secularist political party in Egypt. It was created by the merger of five liberal and leftist parties, as well as remnants of the former NDP-regime.

The Conference Party participated in a 12 January 2015 meeting of multiple parties chaired by Egyptian president Abdel Fattah el-Sisi.

Main merger parties
All of the parties that agreed to or considered joining are:

 Egyptian Citizen Party
 Freedom Party
 Arab Egyptian Union
 Masr El-Fatah

References

2012 establishments in Egypt
Liberal parties in Egypt
Political parties established in 2012
Political parties in Egypt
Secularism in Egypt